A number of steamships have been named Poznan.

Ship names